The Leeward Islands Championships in Athletics is an athletics event organized by the Leeward Islands Athletics Association (LIAA) open for (but not restricted to) athletes from its member associations.

Leeward Islands Athletics Association 
The Leeward Islands Athletics Association (LIAA) was founded in 2002, replacing the Leeward Islands Athletics Steering Committee that had previously organized the Leeward Island Championships.

Member associations 
It comprises the following 8 member associations

Nevis is an independent member, the athletes compete in an own team separately from Saint Kitts.

Competitions 
The LIAA hold two different championships:  so-called Leeward Islands Junior Championships (effectively junior (U20) and youth (U17) championships), and Leeward Islands Youth Championships (effectively age group championships U15, U13, and U11).

Editions

Leeward Islands Junior/Youth Championships 
Leeward Islands Junior (U20) and Youth (U17) Championships, (dubbed Leeward Islands Youth Championships) have been held since 2001.

*: The 2004 event was announced, but no results could be retrieved.  Might have been cancelled.

Leeward Islands Age Group Championships 
Leeward Islands Age Group Championships for athletes U15, U13, and U11, (dubbed Leeward Islands Youth Championships) are held since 1993.

References

External links
LIAA website

Athletics competitions in the Caribbean
Under-20 athletics competitions
Recurring sporting events established in 1993
 
Leeward Islands (Caribbean)